Pomona Island is the largest island within Lake Manapouri, in Fiordland National Park, in New Zealand's South Island.

The island is uninhabited, and lies close to the entrance to the lake's southern arm, 11 kilometres to the west of Manapouri township. Pomona Island was named by surveyor James McKerrow in 1862 after the main island of Scotland's Orkney Islands.

Natural history
Forested areas of Fiordland National Park generally are dominated by beech and podocarp species with understory of numerous ferns and shrubs; crown fern (Lomaria discolor) is an example of chief understory species. Pomona Island is within this area of forest characterisation, and is almost entirely covered in native bush, with the forest also containing kāmahi and rātā. Since the eradication of all introduced animal pests, the health of the island's flora and birdlife has increased noticeably.

Pomona Island, geologically a round-topped granite hill, has given its name to a mineral form known as Pomona Granite.

Pomona Island Charitable Trust 
Pomona Island has its own Charitable Trust it was set up in July 2005 with the aim of restoring the largest inland island in New Zealand to its presumed natural state prior to the introduction of pests. The specific objectives of the Trust are to eradicate all mammalian pest species from Pomona Island ensuring a high quality of indigenous biodiversity on the island in terms of both flora and fauna. Also to reintroduce, through natural and assisted means, birdlife native to Fiordland within the Southwest New Zealand World Heritage Area and provide a safe habitat for endangered and threatened birds to breed thereby increasing the populations of individual species, to monitor conservation activities and their impact on the island's biodiversity.

See also

 Desert island
 List of islands

References

 Pomona Island Trust Website.

External links

Lake islands of New Zealand
Wildlife sanctuaries of New Zealand
Conservation projects in New Zealand
Protected areas of Southland, New Zealand
Uninhabited islands of New Zealand
Islands of Fiordland